Reason is an American company manufacturing boutique amplifiers. The company was founded in St. Charles, Missouri in 2008 by Obeid Khan, who helped turn around Crate Amplifiers, and Anthony Bonadio, a speaker cabinet builder. Their SM series of tube amplifiers includes four different amplifiers; the SM25, a three-channel amp with 6V6 tubes, was called a "killer amp" by Vintage Guitar.

References

Electronics companies established in 2008
Guitar amplifier manufacturers
Audio equipment manufacturers of the United States
2008 establishments in Missouri